The Deutsche Zentrale für Globetrotter (DZG, in English the "German Globetrotter Club") is the largest non-commercial community of adventure travelers with about 800 members in 23 countries in Europe. It is the oldest Globetrotters Club after the British one, called simply the "Globetrotters Club".

History
In 1974 the German Globetrotters Club was founded by Ludmilla Tüting, Friedemann von Engel, Lutz Fehling, Norbert Denninghaus, Erich Drönner, Peter Fritze, Werner Göcke, Wolfgang Köhler, Reinhold Korte and Hannelore Vasel. Serving as a model was the "Globetrotters Club" established in 1948 in England. The idea and name came from Ludmilla Tüting, who dedicated the classic 1972 globetrotter handbook Von Alaska bis Feuerland ("From Alaska to Tierra del Fuego") to "the first German club for globetrotters". This alternative travel guide has sold 70,000 copies. At a 1974 meeting in Hagen the association was founded.

Overall membership since inception is around 2900 individuals.

In the 1990s the then Chairman embezzled some of the club's cash. He openly stated this fact himself in front of the General Assembly, resigned from the Club and repaid the entire amount.

Deutsche Globetrotter-Zentrale
The similarly named "Deutsche Globetrotter-Zentrale" — later Internationale Globetrotter-Zentrale – Interglo, then Globetrott-Zentrale — had no connections to Deutsche Zentrale für Globetrotter. Bernd Tesch used the name in 1975 initially as a brand for his guide book and later established a shop for globetrotter equipment in Kornelimünster in Aachen.

Goals
The club's goals are the collection and sharing of information, finding travel partners, assistance in the preparation of world travel, the reintegration into the company for long-term travel, unifying thoughts, as well as the Association's work. The Club serves as a haven for like-minded between trips.

Among the members are backpackers, Saharan travelers, recreational vehicle travelers, outdoor recreation enthusiasts, long-distance and back country backpackers, campers, travel cyclists, hitchhikers, long-distance motorcycle riders, and Unimog operators. 

Because such travel may be incompatible with professional life, many Globetrotters connect profession and passion and work in tourism, travel book writing, journalism, work as pilots, sell travel supplies, or work as tour guides.

The activities of DZG are carried out voluntarily, commercial interests are not pursued. Service for non-members is provided at cost price. A member list, accessible to members only, provides a register of destinations and contact information for other members.

Publications
The magazine Der Trotter has been published since 1975. The pace of publication is bi-monthly since 2007. So far, about 14,000 editorial pages have appeared. Topics are about 50% travel reports, travel book reviews, schedules, invitations and reports from the Globetrottertreffen meeting, background articles on the individual travel and Association releases.

DZG has operated a Web site since 1996. It contains a public forum of globetrotter travel partner search, background information about the purpose of the Association, information entry to the prepare for travel, book reviews, as well as a member's area. It contains country information, trip reports and downloads of the member magazine.

Globetrottertreffen 
Since 1974, DZG has organized Globetrottertreffen in Germany. The annual summer meeting takes place on the last weekend of June in Hachenburg, Westerwald forest. In addition to bonfire and talks, slide shows and flea market, workshops and readings by authors of travel books take place.

There are in addition about 12 regional meetings, an autumn meeting in the Eifel mountains and a winter meeting in the Weser Uplands.

Travel guide
The Selbstreise-Handbuch (roughly translated as "Do-it-yourself travel guide") arose after inquiries since foundation of the club. Common interests were first answered with loose pages such as the "cheap flight list" by Udo Schwark, then ethnologist Peter Meyer bundled 1984 to the "info folder", after the ninth edition in 1998 it was replaced by Selbstreise-Handbuch in two volumes, created by Norbert Lüdtke on behalf of DZG, published by Peter Meyer Verlag, Frankfurt am Main.

Notable members 
 Heinz Rox-Schulz, founder of Abenteuermuseums together with Oskar Lafontaine
 Werner Freund founder of the Werner Freund Expedition Museum and Wolf Park in Merzig
 Jochen Bludau
 Gerhard Lenser
 Gunther von Hagens
 Heinz Scheidhauer
 Claus von Carnap-Bornheim
 Gerhard Klingenberg
 Rudolph Chimelli

The Club and its members took on a 'pioneer' role.

Many members wrote about their travel experiences not only in Der Trotter, but also in published travel guides. Their books fundamentally influenced the market of travel literature with series and publishers still known today.

The earliest individual travel guides were brought together in the series Globetrotter schreiben für Globetrotter ("Globetrotters write for Globetrotters"), written by Brigitte Blume, Friedemann von Engel, Rainer Lössl, Jens Peters, Rolf Schettler, Heribert Seul, and Ludmilla Tüting.
Authors and self-publishers of this group joined together in 1984/1985 and created the Verlegergemeinschaft Individuelles Reisen e. V. (VIR) ("Publishers' community individual travel company") with Helmut Hermann, Edgar Hoff, Peter Rump, Sigrid & wil Tondok and in 1976 they founded Peter Meyer Verlag.

From this emerged the Verlagsgruppe Reise Know-How ("travel know-how publishing group"). Peter Meyer Verlag acts again independently since 1991 and was the first who provided his travel books with handle brands worldwide. The members Udo Schwark and Gisela Walther were the first to translate the Lonely Planet travel guide from English and moved to the Gisela Walther Verlag in 1981. Founders Stefan Loose, Michael Müller, Conrad Stein were also members of DZG.

A number of other members became known after they started selling travel equipment and now dominate this sector of the economy. Klaus and Erika Därr opened the first retail store of the globetrotter scene in Munich in 1975 with expedition equipment. Wolfgang Maas and Gerhardt Lauche founded expedition equipment company Lauche and Maas in 1976 in Munich. Klaus Denart founded Globetrotter Ausrüstung ("Globetrotter equipment") in Hamburg in 1979 as the first North German supplier, and is today the largest travel supplier in Europe.

References 
Notes

Bibliography
 Der Trotter. The magazine of the Globetrotters. Deutsche Zentrale für Globetrotter .
 Das Selbstreise-Handbuch. Erstellt von Norbert Lüdtke im Auftrag der Deutschen Zentrale für Globetrotter (Hrsg.). Peter Meyer Verlag, Frankfurt am Main.
 Volume 1: Zur Reisevorbereitung. 4. aktualisierte Auflage. 2005, .
 Volume 2: Für unterwegs. 2002, .
 Outdoor – Tipps, Tricks und Kniffe für Abenteurer auf Weltreise. Erstellt von Norbert Lüdtke im Auftrag der Deutschen Zentrale für Globetrotter (Herausgeber). Peter Meyer Verlag, Frankfurt am Main 2010, .
 Edith Kresta, Günter Ermlich: Welterprobte Althippie. In: die tageszeitung. Magazin Dossier March 11/12, 2000, über Ludmilla Tüting.
 Der Trotter. Sonderausgabe zum Trotter 100: Geschichte der Globetrotter. Herausgegeben von Norbert Lüdtke im Auftrag der Deutschen Zentrale für Globetrotter. Düsseldorf 1999. Bezug über www.globetrotter.org
 Norbert Lüdtke: Die Vielfalt droht zu kippen. In: die tageszeitung. July 15, 2006.
 Reiner Leinen: Gibt es ein Leben nach der Reise? Globetrotter entdecken neben der Welt vor allem sich selbst. In: Frankfurter Rundschau. 17. Juli 1999.
 Christiane Grefe: Reisen. Reihe Kleine Philosophie der Passionen. dtv, 1998, .
 Willy Bremkes: Einen auf Globi machen. In: touristik report. March 1, 1985.
 Brigitte Zander: Der Traum vom anderen Reisen. In: stern. 8/1984
 Ariane Barth: Die Globetrotter: Aus allen Zwängen fliehen. In: Der Spiegel. 14/1983.
 Maria Zimmermann: Die Welteroberer mit dem Schlafsack. Globetrotter, die Einzelgänger in der Reisegesellschaft. In: Saarbrücker Zeitung. July 7/8, 1979.
 
 Klaus Betz: Sie treffen sich in Bombay und helfen sich in Rio. Globetrotter haben Freunde auf der ganzen Welt. Ihre Clubs, ihre Literatur, ihre Ausrüstung. In: Süddeutsche Zeitung. November 9, 1978.
 
 Barbara von Ihering: Die Welt in der Tasche. Globetrotter schreiben ihre Reisebücher selbst. In: Die Zeit. Nr. 36/1976.
 Christiane Grefe: Weg und hin. In: Die Zeit. Nr. 35/1999.
 Christel Burghoff, Edith Kresta: On The Road Again. Über Hippies, Backpacker und Wanderer. Und über die Lust, den Flow beim alternativen Reisen zu entdecken. Ein Rückblick mit Ausblick. In: die tageszeitung.'' January 25, 2003.

External links 
 

Non-profit organisations based in Berlin